This is a list of destinations regularly served by the Swiss airline SkyWork Airlines as of October 2017. The airline ceased operations on 29 August 2018.

Destinations

Austria
Vienna – Vienna International Airport

Croatia
Brač – Brač Airport seasonal
Rijeka – Rijeka Airport seasonal
Zadar – Zadar Airport seasonal

France
Paris – Charles de Gaulle Airport
Figari – Figari Sud-Corse Airport seasonal

Germany
Berlin – Berlin Tegel Airport
Hamburg – Hamburg Airport
Heringsdorf – Heringsdorf Airport seasonal
Munich – Munich Airport

Italy
Cagliari – Cagliari-Elmas Airport seasonal
Elba – Marina di Campo Airport seasonal
Grosseto – Grosseto Airport seasonal
Olbia – Olbia – Costa Smeralda Airport seasonal

Netherlands
Amsterdam – Amsterdam Airport Schiphol

Spain
Barcelona – Barcelona–El Prat Airport
Ibiza – Ibiza Airport seasonal
Mahón – Menorca Airport seasonal
Palma de Mallorca – Son Sant Joan Airport

Switzerland
Basel – EuroAirport Basel–Mulhouse–Freiburg
Bern – Bern Airport Base

United Kingdom
London – London City Airport

References

Lists of airline destinations